Zouhair Khazim (born 1960) is a Syrian politician who has been minister of transport since 2020.

Personal life
He is married and has three children.

See also
 First Hussein Arnous government
 Second Hussein Arnous government

References

Living people
1960 births
21st-century Syrian politicians
Transport ministers of Syria
Arab Socialist Ba'ath Party – Syria Region politicians